David Kemper is an American television writer and producer who is best known for his work on the science fiction/fantasy show Farscape. He was raised in Oak Park, Michigan, where he attended Ferndale High School. At school he was a baseball player. He graduated from the University of Michigan before moving to California.

In addition to Farscape, Kemper wrote episodes of Star Trek: The Next Generation, SeaQuest DSV, The Pretender, Swamp Thing, and Stargate SG-1, and was also the executive producer for the  SyFy channel film Aztec Rex.

In October 2006 made a deal with the Sci Fi Channel to supply five movies to their Saturday night movie franchise.

Filmography

Television
The numbers in writing credits refer to the number of episodes.

References

External links

Living people
American male writers
Farscape
University of Michigan alumni
Year of birth missing (living people)